The 1982 German Formula Three Championship was a multi-event motor racing championship for single-seat open wheel formula racing cars held across Europe. The championship featured drivers competing in two-litre Formula Three racing cars which conformed to the technical regulations, or formula, for the championship. It commenced on 28 March at Nürburgring and ended at Kassel-Calden on 3 October after ten rounds.

Volkswagen Motorsport driver John Nielsen became first Danish champion of the German Formula Three Championship. He dominated the championship, finishing ahead of all of his championship rivals in all seven races he was able to finish. His main title rival Bruno Eichmann had only won race at Salzburgring which wasn't attended by Nielsen. Gerhard Berger completed the top-three in the drivers standings. Franz Konrad was the only other driver who won race in the season.

Teams and drivers

Calendar

Results

Championship standings
Points are awarded as follows:

References

External links
 

German Formula Three Championship seasons
Formula Three season